Wye Head is an area in Derbyshire, England. It is in the civil parish of Burbage, on the outskirts of Buxton. It is so named because of a major rising of the River Wye, which carries much of the water from Poole's Cavern.

References

Geography of Derbyshire
High Peak, Derbyshire